is a Japanese manga series written by Gun Snark and illustrated by Hikaru Suruga, based on a visual novel of the same name. The series is a spinoff of Hajime Isayama's popular  manga. The story follows the character of Levi Ackerman before he joins the Survey Corps.

The series is published by Kodansha in Japan and by Kodansha Comics in the United States.  A two part OVA was released in 2014 and 2015.

Plot
The story is a prequel to Attack on Titan, and follows Levi during his days as a criminal in the underground city, when he was with his two best friends Isabel Magnolia and Farlan Church before Erwin Smith recruits him into the Survey Corps.

Conception and development
Before Suruga began the manga, her editor-in-chief suggested that she visit the Metropolitan Area Outer Underground Discharge Channel so she could better visualize the Underground where Levi and the others live at the beginning of the story.  It was while there that Suruga was first able to picture how large an 18-meter tall Titan actually would be.

While drawing Levi, Suruga attempted to make him appear younger than he does in Attack on Titan.  She noted that his lack of emotiveness made it difficult to choose which expressions to give him while drawing.  With Isabel, Suruga attempted to convey a "lively, energetic" character who, while "very cute", was just as capable at fighting Titans as anyone else.  Suruga had difficulty drawing Farlan's face, as she wanted to give him characteristics that would clearly distinguish him from the other two main characters. Despite that, she found it surprisingly easy to copy the character's hairstyle from Namaniku ATK's original design.

Media

Visual novel
The character designs were provided by Namaniku ATK, also of Nitroplus.

Manga
A prologue chapter was published in the November 2013 issue of Kodansha's magazine Aria on September 28, 2013. The prologue was republished in the December issue on October 28, 2013 after the first issue to contain it quickly sold out. The series regular began in the January 2014 issue on November 28, 2013. Kodansha made the decision to increase the magazine's print run 5-fold (500%) due to the series' popularity, starting with the January 2014 issue. When they reprinted the issue on December 16, 2013, they increased the number of copies again, making the total print run a 10-fold (1000%) increase over the previously recorded monthly sales of 13,667 copies. A special chapter was published in the May 2014 issue of Kodansha's Monthly Shōnen Sirius magazine on March 25, 2014. The series ended in the August 2014 issue on June 28, 2014.

After the first volume was released, the decision to reprint it came on the same day.  A booklet containing a set of character sketches and the prologue chapter was bundled with a special edition of the volume. A complete color edition containing the entire series would be released on December 5, 2017. Kodansha Comics announced their license to the series at their New York Comic Con panel on October 11, 2013.

Volumes

Anime
A two-episode anime OVA adaptation was announced in the 14th volume of Attack on Titan.  The OVAs were produced by the same staff that produced the Attack on Titan television series.  The episodes were directed by Tetsurō Araki and written by Yasuko Kobayashi, with animation by Wit Studio.  Character designs were provided by Kyoji Asano.  The insert song is "So ist es immer" (Just Like it Always is) by Hiroyuki Sawano.  The OVAs starred Hiroshi Kamiya as Levi, Daisuke Ono as Erwin, Kōji Yusa as Furlan, and Mariya Ise as Isabel.  The first episode was included with the 15th volume of Attack on Titan on December 9, 2014, and the second episode was included with the 16th volume on April 9, 2015.

On January 15, 2016, Kodansha Comics announced that they would release the two episodes with the special editions of the 18th and 19th English volumes of the manga, on April 5, 2016 and August 2, 2016, respectively. On May 2, 2022, it was announced that Attack on Titan's eight OVAs would be dubbed and released by Funimation and Crunchyroll weekly starting on May 8, 2022. The No Regrets OVAs were released from May 29 to June 5.

Episode list

Reception
The manga has over 1.5 million copies in print in Japan. The first volume of the manga had 500,000 copies in print as of April 2014, having sold 140,186 copies within the first five days of its release.  The volume was also the 57th best-selling manga volume in Japan in 2014. The first volume of the English translation appeared on the New York Times Manga Best Sellers list for 18 nonconsecutive weeks, while the second volume was on the list for 12 weeks.

Reviewing the first volume for The Fandom Post, Kate O’Neil gave it a grade of B.  Noting Levi's status as a fan-favorite character, she wrote: "I often wonder at how much of the backstory in these spinoffs was the result of the original author's notes or the spinoff writer responding to the desires of the fanbase."  She also commented that the art is "handled by someone other than the author, which means that characters are actually well proportioned and the perspective is solid."

Notes

Works cited

References

External links
  
  at Kodansha Comics
 

No Regrets
Anime OVAs composed by Hiroyuki Sawano
Crunchyroll anime
Dark fantasy anime and manga
Films with screenplays by Yasuko Kobayashi
Funimation
Kodansha manga
OVAs based on manga
Post-apocalyptic anime and manga
Prequel comics
Production I.G
Shōjo manga
Visual novels
Wit Studio